Honey 2 is a 2011 American dance film and a sequel to the 2003 film Honey, directed by Bille Woodruff, who directed the original film. It stars Kat Graham, Randy Wayne, Seychelle Gabriel and Lonette McKee, reprising her role as Connie Daniels, the mother of Honey Daniels from the first film. The film was released to cinemas in United Kingdom on June 10, 2011 and straight-to-video in the United States on February 21, 2012 on DVD and Blu-ray.

The film was followed by two straight-to-video sequels, Honey 3: Dare to Dance (2016) and Honey: Rise Up and Dance (2018).

Plot 
17-year-old Maria Bennett (Kat Graham) returns from juvi to rebuild her life with nothing but a talent for street dance and a burning ambition to prove herself. She finds refuge in the place that made her feel most alive, as a kid at the rec center where Honey's exuberant classes first ignited her passion for dance.

Keeping on the straight and narrow means living with Honey's mother Connie (Lonette McKee) and holding down a job. Wanting to start over, as being with her old crew landed her in juvi, she joins the HD crew.  She wants to give pay back to her old crew (the 718 Crew) and ex-boyfriend Luis (Christopher Martinez) after realizing the bad influence they continue to have.

Maria convinces HD to audition to compete on the television dance competition "Dance Battlezone" which means going up against the 718. The 718 tries to demotivate HD in a street dance-off, and manages to temporarily poach Tina from HD after. Once they involve her in stealing, she realises they are bad news, and begs HD to take her back.

Maria finds passion, romance (with Brandon, NYU student and fellow HD member), and hard work in the HD crew while realizing why she started dancing in the first place.

Cast 
 Kat Graham (credited as Katerina Graham) as Maria Bennet, a former member of the 718 Dance Crew, currently a member of the HD Crew
 Christopher 'War' Martinez as Luis, the leader of the 718 Dance Crew and Maria's ex-boyfriend
 Randy Wayne as Brandon, an HD Crew member and Maria's love interest 
 Seychelle Gabriel as Tina, an HD Crew member
 Beau "Casper" Smart as Ricky, an HD Crew member
 Tyler Nelson as Darnell, an HD Crew member
 Brittany Perry-Russell as Lyric, an HD Crew member
 Melissa Molinaro as Carla, an HD Crew member
 Lonette McKee as Connie Daniels, Maria's foster mother
 Gerry Bednob as Mr. Kapoor 
 Mario Lopez as Host
 Audrina Patridge as Hot Celebrity Judge
 Laurie Ann Gibson as Katrina, Celebrity Judge
 Rosero McCoy as Jonas, Celebrity Judge
 Alexis Jordan as Herself
 Luke Broadlick as HD Crew #1
 Justin Deanda as HD Crew #2

Reception

References

External links 
 

2011 drama films
2011 films
American dance films
American drama films
Films about dance competitions
Films set in New York City
Films shot in New York City
Films directed by Bille Woodruff
2010s hip hop films
American sequel films
Universal Pictures films
2010s English-language films
2010s American films